Guasila is a comune (municipality) in the Province of South Sardinia in the Italian region Sardinia, located about  north of Cagliari.

Guasila borders the following municipalities: Furtei, Gesico, Guamaggiore, Ortacesus, Pimentel, Samatzai, Segariu, Serrenti, Villamar, Villanovafranca.

Demographic evolution

References 

Cities and towns in Sardinia